Magnet Cove is a census-designated place (CDP) and former town in Hot Spring County, Arkansas, United States. It is located in the Ouachita Mountains southeast of Hot Springs, on Arkansas Highway 51 north of U.S. Highway 270. As of the 2020 census, the town of Magnet Cove had a population of 692.

Geography
The boundaries of the former town, with a population of 5, represented only a very small portion of the overall Magnet Cove community. The community suspended its incorporation in 2006. As of 2015, the U.S. Census Bureau recognized an area along Highway 51 extending from Harver Hills Road in the southeast to Gourdneck Valley Road in the northwest as the Magnet Cove Census Designated Place. The CDP occupies the topographic Magnet Cove, a broad valley along Stone Quarry Creek surrounded by hills, and includes the Magnet Cove High School and Elementary School, as well as Magnet Cove United Methodist Church.

Geology
The Magnet Cove igneous complex lies to the west of the town. The area is known for its abundance of odd minerals, including magnetite usually in the form of lodestone, as well as many other species such as rutile, anatase, brookite, perovskite, and some rare-earth-bearing minerals.

Demographics

2020 census

Note: the US Census treats Hispanic/Latino as an ethnic category. This table excludes Latinos from the racial categories and assigns them to a separate category. Hispanics/Latinos can be of any race.

Education
It is in the Magnet Cove School District.

References

Census-designated places in Hot Spring County, Arkansas
Former municipalities in Arkansas
Populated places disestablished in 2006
Census-designated places in Arkansas